The Beosi are short-statured hunter-gatherers of the central highlands of Madagascar. They are distinct from the Mikea hunter-gatherers and horticulturalists of the lowlands.

Language

The Boesi speak a dialect of the Malagasy language, which originated in southern Borneo. Speculation that there may be remnants of a Vazimba language in Beosi speech was investigated by Blench & Walsh (2009). Beosi speech was found to have a relatively high proportion of vocabulary that cannot be identified with words in other varieties of Malagasy, substantially more than the Mikea dialect, and is more likely than Mikea to retain a Vazimba substrate, if such a thing even exists. The possibility is complicated by the extensive use of evasive language and cant by the Beosi, which is designed to hinder understanding by outsiders.

Notes 

Vazimba
Ethnic groups in Madagascar